Calton is a village and a former parochial chapelry and civil parish, now in the parish of Waterhouses, in the Staffordshire Moorlands district of Staffordshire, England. In 1931 the parish had a population of 222. The chapelry contained the four parishes of Croxden, Blore, Mayfield, and Waterfall. In 1866, the four parishes became the civil parish of Calton, and on 1 April 1934 the parish was abolished to form Waterhouses. The village of Calton stands in the old parish of Mayfield, along with the chapel of St Mary.

The Peak District Boundary Walk runs through the village.

See also
Listed buildings in Waterhouses, Staffordshire

References 

Villages in Staffordshire
Towns and villages of the Peak District
Former civil parishes in Staffordshire
Staffordshire Moorlands